This is a list of fellows of the Royal Society elected in 1909.

Fellows
Edward Charles Cyril Baly  (1871–1948)
Sir Thomas Barlow  (1845–1945)
Ernest William Barnes  (1874–1953)
Francis Arthur Bather  (1863–1934)
Sir Robert Abbott Hadfield  (1858–1940)
Sir Alfred Daniel Hall  (1864–1942)
Sir Arthur Harden  (1865–1940)
Alfred John Jukes-Browne  (1851–1914)
Sir John Graham Kerr  (1869–1957)
William James Lewis  (1847–1926)
John Alexander McClelland  (1870–1920)
William McFadden Orr  (1866–1934)
Alfred Barton Rendle  (1865–1938)
James Lorrain Smith  (1862–1931)
James Thomas Wilson  (1861–1945)

Foreign members
George Ellery Hale  (1868–1938)
Hugo Kronecker  (1839–1914)
Charles Emile Picard  (1856–1941)
Santiago Ramon y Cajal  (1852–1934)

References

1909
1909 in the United Kingdom
1909 in science